Facebook Watch is a video on demand service operated by American company Meta Platforms (previously named Facebook, Inc.). The company announced the service in August 2017 and was available to all U.S. users that month. Facebook Watch's original video content is produced for the company by others, who earn 55% of advertising revenue (Facebook keeps the other 45%).

Facebook Watch offers personalized recommendations for videos to watch, as well as categorized content bundles depending on factors such as popularity and social media engagement. Facebook wants both short-form and long-form entertainment on its platform. The company reported a total budget of $1 billion for content through 2018. Facebook monetizes videos through mid-roll advertising breaks and planned to test pre-roll advertising in 2018. On August 30, 2018, Facebook Watch became available to all Facebook users worldwide.

As of September 2020, Facebook reported that Facebook Watch had more than 1.25 billion monthly visitors, 46% of its monthly active user base at that time.

History
On August 9, 2017, Facebook, Inc. announced that it would be launching its own video on demand service. During the same announcement it was stated that the new service would be called Facebook Watch. The video on demand service was launched for a small group of U.S. users a day later, with a rollout to all U.S. users beginning at the end of August.

In May and June 2018, Facebook launched around six news programs from partners including BuzzFeed, Vox, CNN, and Fox News. These programs, developed by Facebook's head of news partnerships Campbell Brown, reportedly had an overall budget of US$90 million.

On July 25, 2018, Facebook gave their first presentation ever at the annual Television Critics Association's annual summer press tour. During Facebook's allotted time, Fidji Simo, the Vice President of Product for Video, and Ricky Van Veen, the Head of Global Creative Strategy, showcased Facebook's continuing ramp-up of original programming on Facebook Watch. On August 30, 2018, Facebook Watch became available internationally to all users of the social network worldwide.

Budgets and monetization

Content budgets
For short-form videos, Facebook originally had a budget of roughly $10,000-$40,000 per episode, though renewal contracts have placed the budget in the $50,000-$70,000 range. Long-form TV-length series have budgets between $250,000 to over $1 million. The Wall Street Journal reported in September 2017 that the company was willing to spend up to $1 billion on original video content through 2018.

Monetization 
Facebook keeps 45% of ad-break revenue for content shown on Facebook Watch, while its content-producing partners receive 55% of ad revenue. In January 2017, the company announced that it would be adding "mid-roll" advertising to its videos, in which ads will appear in videos after users have watched at least 20 seconds. In December 2017, Ad Age reported that Facebook was lifting a long-time ban on "pre-roll" ads, an advertising format that shows promotional content before users start the actual video. Facebook had resisted using pre-roll ads because the format has a "reputation for annoying viewers" who want to get to the desired content, though the report stated that the company would nevertheless try the format.

Steve Ellis, CEO of WhoSay, a social influencer marketing company, told Ad Age that "YouTube already established that people will sit through and tolerate pre-roll" and that "It's proven that they haven't sent consumers fleeing, so it makes sense that Facebook would pursue a similar strategy as it builds out its original content experience". Two weeks after Ad Ages report, Facebook updated its blog to note that the pre-roll advertising format would begin testing in 2018, and that there were going to be changes to mid-roll ads; specifically, they cannot appear until a minute into a video, and are only available for videos that run for at least three minutes, as opposed to the original rule of appearing after 20 seconds on videos potentially as short as 90 seconds.

Content

In addition to original programming, Facebook Watch also distributes content licensed from other companies. On November 30, 2018, it was announced that the streaming service had struck a deal with 20th Century Fox Television to stream television series Buffy the Vampire Slayer, Angel, and Firefly.

Reception
Morgan Stanley analyst Brian Nowak estimates that "Facebook Watch" can bring in $565 million in revenue to Facebook by the end of 2018. Jefferies analyst Brent Thill has predicted that the service has the potential to earn $12 billion in revenue by 2022.

See also 
 Facebook Reels

References

External links
 

Video on demand services
Video hosting
Watch
Streaming media systems
Internet properties established in 2017